Senrid is an original fantasy novel by Sherwood Smith published in May 2007 by Norilana Books, reissued by Book View Cafe.

Blurb
The kids on the good side are united in one thing: regarding Senrid as a villain. So what do you do when you're fifteen, supposedly king of one of the most powerful kingdoms in the world, but all you have on your side are wit, will, and maybe a few skills? And what if the people you like best are your enemies, and your relatives want to see you dead?

Plot summary
Senrid is King of Marloven Hess, but in name only because his uncle Tdanerand holds the power. When the Marlovens try to attack the nearby kingdom of Vasande Leror they are defeated by the combined efforts of Vasande Leror's King Leander, his small army, a little bit of magic and a shapeshifting girl named Faline. Senrid's first mission is to get revenge on Leander (and his whining sister Kitty) and Faline. This gets more complicated as many allies of Leander and Faline get involved to try to rescue them. Eventually as magic combines and nearly destroys them in a battle they are thrown off world. When they get back, Senrid must travel and discover whether he wants to join the evil black mages for power or join the white forces of good to help his country.

Main characters
Senrid : King of Marloven Hess, this is his story of self-discovery.

Leander: King of Vasande Leror

Kitty: Sister to Leander

Faline: a Yxuebarec (shapechanger) from Mearsies Heili.

Tdanerand: Senrid's uncle who is trying to take over Marloven Hess.

Notes

External links
 Sartorias-deles Wiki
 Author Sherwood Smith's Homepage

2007 American novels
2007 fantasy novels
American fantasy novels
Novels by Sherwood Smith